The 2010–11 West Bank Premier League started on 26 August 2010 and concluded on 7 May 2011. Markaz Shabab Al-Am'ari won the title due to a better goal difference over Hilal Al-Quds.

Clubs

Final standings

Top scorers
The top-scorers were:

References

West Bank Premier League seasons
1
West